Malik Dinar Mosque is the second  oldest mosque in India, situated in Thalangara in Kasaragod town of Kerala state, India.

History
Over the years, Kasaragod acquired the considerable importance as a centre of Islam on the west coast. It is the site of one of the mosques believed to have been founded by Malik Deenar. According to Qissat Shakarwati Farmad, the Masjids at Kodungallur, Kollam, Madayi, Barkur, Mangalore, Kasaragod, Kannur, Dharmadam, Panthalayini, and Chaliyam, were built during the era of Malik Dinar, and they are among the oldest Masjids in Indian Subcontinent. It is believed that Malik Dinar died at Thalangara in Kasaragod town.

Location
The mosque, Juma Masjid, which is one of the best kept and most attractive in the district, is located at Thalangara. Thalangara beach is on the western side of Kasaragod town and it is close to the railway station.

Holy grave
The mosque contains the grave of Malik Deenar, one of the Taabi’eens (people who had seen the companions of the Islamic prophet Muhammad) and the place is sacred to Muslims. Another notable mosque, in Kasaragod is the Theruvath Mosque which is in the center of the town.

Pilgrim center
Thalangara mosque is a prominent pilgrim center of Kasaragod district.

Malik Deenar Uroos
Malik Deenar Uroos (مالك دينار عروس) is the one of the main observations of Indian muslims to celebrate the arrival of  Malik Deenar to  Kerala, India. It is conducted in the holy month of Muharram and lasts for one month. It includes various rituals such as the Ziyarath (visiting of tomb), Pataka Uyarthal (flag hosting) and Annadanam.

Image gallery

References

Mosques in Kerala
Tourist attractions in Kasaragod district
Religious buildings and structures in Kasaragod district